Kalen Damessi (born 28 March 1990) is a Togolese professional footballer who plays as a forward for Championnat National 3 club Stade Poitevin FC.

Career
Born in Abidjan, Ivory Coast, Damessi has played for Toulouse B, Jura Sud, Lille B, Quevilly-Rouen, Concarneau, Concarneau B, Sedan and Stade Poitevin FC.

He made his international debut for Togo in 2012.

References

1990 births
Living people
Association football forwards
Togolese footballers
Togo international footballers
Toulouse FC players
Jura Sud Foot players
Lille OSC players
US Quevilly-Rouen Métropole players
US Concarneau players
CS Sedan Ardennes players
Stade Poitevin FC players
Championnat National players
Championnat National 2 players
Championnat National 3 players
2013 Africa Cup of Nations players
21st-century Togolese people